Goose Green is a settlement in the Falkland Islands

Goose Green could also refer to the following places in England:

Goose Green, Altrincham
Goose Green, Cumbria
Goose Green, Essex	
Goose Green, Gloucestershire
Goose Green, Greater Manchester, a suburb of Wigan
Goose Green, Hampshire
Goose Green, Kent
Goose Green, Lancashire
Goose Green, London, a park in the London Borough of Southwark
Goose Green, Norfolk
Goose Green, West Sussex
Goose Green, West Yorkshire